Maritime Days are holidays typically established to recognize accomplishments in the maritime field. Maritime Days include:
 China National Maritime Day
 European Maritime Day
 Indian Maritime Day (5 April)
 Mexican National Maritime Day
 Pakistan National Maritime Day
 Slovenian Maritime Day (7 March)
 United States National Maritime Day 
 World Maritime Day

See also

Navy Day

Maritime culture
Types of national holidays